Tigercub are a three-piece rock band from Brighton, UK. The band are Jamie Stephen Hall (vocals and lead guitar), James Allix (drums) and Jimi Wheelwright (bass). Tigercub have released three EPs, the Hands EP (2013), Repressed Semantics (2015) and Evolve or Die (2017), and two full-length albums, Abstract Figures in the Dark (2016) and As Blue as Indigo (2021).

History 
Tigercub was formed by Hall and Allix in 2011. The founding members met at a university in Brighton. In 2012 Hall and Allix were joined by Wheelwright.

Early releases 
The band recorded and self-released the Hands EP at Brighton Electric in 2013. Matt Bigland of Dinosaur Pile-Up produced Tigercub's next single "Blue Blood" with Tom Dalgety. "Blue Blood" was released on Raygun Records in 2014 and became the band's first commercial release. Following this, Tigercub were invited to tour the UK with Royal Blood. The band went back into Brighton Electric to record a double A-side "Centrefold"/"Trendsetter" with Dalgety, which was released on Jazz Life in 2014. In November 2014, Tigercub toured Europe with Blood Red Shoes.

Tigercub released the double A-side "Destroy"/"You" on limited-edition vinyl with Too Pure Records, and digitally with Brighton label Cannibal Hymns.An exclusive CD compilation Meet Tigercub was released with P-Vine Records in Japan  and with Smack Face Music in Australia. 

Tigercub signed to VENN Records to release Repressed Semantics in November 2015. 

The EP was supported by Tigercub's first UK headline tour, followed by a series of dates across Europe with Dilly Dally. The Guardian described Repressed Semantics as "a self-contained world for you to discover and get lost in", and Crack Magazine called Tigercub "one of Brighton's most promising up-and-coming bands".

Abstract Figures in the Dark 
Tigercub's first full-length album, Abstract Figures in the Dark, was released on 11 November 2016, via Alcopop! Records. The album was produced by Alex Newport and mastered by John Greenham.

The press response was positive and highlighted the album's difficult themes and genre-defying content. Clash said that the release was "jagged and harsh. It is a pill that isn't easily swallowed, nor digested; it is emotionally overwhelming and entirely self-aware. It doesn't fit neatly into a box on the shelf marked 'punk' or 'grunge.'"

Evolve or Die 
Tigercub released their second EP Evolve or Die in 2017 via Alcopop! Records.

Dork said, "Throughout the four-track offering every moment counts, adding up to a journey that feels fleeting but necessary. New depths are explored with 'Into The Ashes' conjuring imagery of dystopian-type fallout, while 'It's Only Love' begins as a melancholic number, but soon morphs into a different beast entirely, with a funk-driven heart (...) every second yields either complete devotion or self-realisation."

After constant touring, the band took a break to pursue other creative outlets, including Hall’s side-project Nancy.

As Blue as Indigo 
As Blue as Indigo was written by Hall and co-produced by Hall and Adrian Bushby. Bushby also engineered the record. As Blue as Indigo was later mixed by Tom Dalgety and released on BLAME Recordings.

The title of the album hints at Hall's introspective approach to lyrical themes, exploring personal topics including anxiety, depression, toxic masculinity, the death of his grandmother, and the recent suicide of a close friend.

As Blue as Indigo reached number one on the Independent Album Breakers, number five on the UK Rock & Metal chart, number 11 on the UK Independent Albums chart, number 12 on the Vinyl Chart, and number 30 on the UK Physical Albums Chart. During this period, the band toured extensively with Royal Blood.  

The band recorded an Amazon Original track, "Overload", in August 2021.

Members 
 Jamie Stephen Hall – vocals, lead guitar
 Jimi Wheelwright – bass
 James Allix – drums

Discography 
Studio albums
 Abstract Figures in the Dark (Alcopop! Records, 2016) 
 As Blue as Indigo (BLAME Recordings, 2021)

Compilation albums
 Meet Tigercub (P-Vine Records, Japanese exclusive CD, 2015)

EPs
 Repressed Semantics (VENN Records, 2015)
 Evolve or Die (Alcopop! Records, 2017)

Singles
 "The Perfume of Decay" (Loose Grove Records, 2022) - No. 32 Mainstream Rock Songs
 "Blue Mist in my Head" (BLAME Recordings, 2021) 
 "Beauty" (BLAME Recordings, 2021)
 "Stop Beating on my Heart (Like a Bass Drum)" (BLAME Recordings, 2021) 
 "Blue Blood" (Raygun, 2014)
 "Centrefold"/"Trendsetter" (Jazz Life, 2014)
 "Destroy"/"You" (Cannibal Hymns/Too Pure Records, 2015)

References 

English indie rock groups
English alternative rock groups
P-Vine Records artists
Too Pure artists